Arnaldo Di Maria (3 December 1935 – 16 February 2011) was an Italian racing cyclist. He rode in the 1962 Tour de France.

References

External links
 

1935 births
2011 deaths
Italian male cyclists
Place of birth missing
Cyclists from Liguria
Sportspeople from Genoa